Japanese people in Spain consist largely of expatriate managers in Japanese corporations, as well as international students. There are also some people of Japanese ancestry in Spain, including descendants of 17th-century migrants to Spain, as well as migrants from among Nikkei populations in Latin America. According to Spain's National Statistical Institute, 4,898 Japanese citizens resided in the country ; Japan's Ministry of Foreign Affairs gave a higher figure of 8,080 .

History

The first Japanese people to settle in Spain were the members of an embassy led by Hasekura Tsunenaga. Instead of returning to Japan in 1617, six samurai remained in Coria del Río, near Seville. The surname Japón (Spanish for "Japan") is conserved among approximately 700 inhabitants of Coria del Río, identifying them as descendants of the members of Hasekura Tsunenaga's delegation.

The first Japanese business established in Spain was SANYO España.S.A. in 1969. Since then Catalonia became the main point of Japanese business operations in Spain.

Between the 1970s and 1980s, Nikkeis—people of Japanese ancestry from various countries of Latin America—settled in Spain, fleeing financial crises or political oppression in their home countries. Since the 1970s, many Japanese have also come to Spain as businesspeople and students. In 1966, there were only about 280 Japanese nationals in Spain, but this number grew to 2,824 by 1993.

Demographics
As of 2001 5,167 Japanese citizens resided in Spain, with 1,189 of them in Barcelona and 87 of them in the remainder of Catalonia. Most residing in Catalonia are employees of Japanese companies.

There are an estimated 2,000 people of Japanese descent in the Madrid area, most of them working for Japanese firms.

The peak number of the Japanese population in Las Palmas registered with the Japanese consulate there was 365 people in 1977.

Institutions
The Barcelona Suiyokai is an association of Japanese companies that operates in Barcelona. It operates a Japanese new year festival. In 2004 57 companies were a part of the association.

In Barcelona there is also a Go club, a Haiku club, an association of Japanese language teachers, an association of the alumni of the Japanese complementary school, a golf club, and a Hispano-Japanese association.

The Casa opened in 1967 in Monte Lentiscal and its annex opened in October 1973. The main building closed in June 1981 and the annex closed in December 1985.

Health care
From 1971 to 1981 there were Japanese nurses sent to the Queen Victoria and Santa Catalina hospitals in Las Palmas to assist Japanese sailors.

Education

Spain has three Japanese international schools: the Japanese School in Barcelona, Colegio Japonés de Las Palmas and the Colegio Japonés de Madrid. The two cities, Barcelona and Madrid, also have weekend Japanese education programmes.

The  previously existed. Located in Tafira Baja, it opened in October 1973, making it the first Japanese school in Spain and the third-oldest in Europe. It closed in March 2001.

There is a Japanese library in Eixample, Barcelona that opened in 1992. Most of the patrons are Japanese, though locals may also use the facilities. The library is located inside a flat.

Notable people
 Kiyoshi Uematsu, Spanish judoka
 Kenji Uematsu, Spanish judoka
 Yuu Shirota, actor and singer (Originally from Tokyo, Japan)
 David Silva, professional footballer
 Pedro Shimose, poet, professor and essayist; his working and living in Madrid.
 Rayito, musician and producer

See also
 Japan–Spain relations

References

Notes

Sources
 
 
  (Archive)
 
  Ávila Tàpies, Rosalía (University of Kyoto) and Josefina Domínguez Mujica (Universidad de Las Palmas). "The Canary Islands in the Japanese Imaginary: The Analysis of Three Contemporary Narratives" (Page archive, PDF archive). Anuario de Estudios Atlánticos ISSN 0570-4065, Las Palmas de Gran Canaria (2011), no. 57, pp. 525–56. Received 26 May 2010. Accepted 30 June 2010. English abstract available.
 
  (Archive) English abstract available

Further reading
 
 Avila Tàpies, Rosalia (2008) Inmigración japonesa e interculturalidad en España: el caso de la 'Sociedad Tanpopo' (Archive). Boletín de la Real Sociedad Geográfica , CXLIV, p. 144-171.
 Avila Tàpies, Rosalia (Konan University) (2008). "Building friendship networks and intercultural spaces: the case of Japanese women in Spain" (Archive). Migracijske i Etničke Teme /Migration and Ethnic Themes (Profile page), 24-4, p. 341-352. Available at Academia.edu.
 Clavería, Laura (2010), "Artistas japoneses en España: Una aproximación al caso de Cataluña", (Archive)  Interasia Papers, Barcelona: Universidad Autónoma de Barcelona.
 Fukuda, Makiko. "Castilian or Catalan? Linguistic survival strategies of Japanese residents in Catalonia, Spain." (Archive). In: Saxena, Anju and Åke Viberg (editors). "Multilingualism: Proceedings of the 23rd Scandinavian Conference of Linguistics." Uppsala University, 1–3 October 2008. Start p. 170.

External links
  Asociación de empresas Japonesas Shacho Kai
 Shachokai Barcelona
  Eikyô, influencias japonesas

Ethnic groups in Spain
Spain
Asian diaspora in Spain